Botanophila discreta is a species of fly in the family Anthomyiidae. It is found in the  Palearctic.

References

External links
Ecology of Commanster 

Anthomyiidae
Insects described in 1826